Mohamed Taabouni (born 29 March 2002) is a Dutch professional footballer who plays as midfielder for Feyenoord in Eredivisie.

Career
Mohamed Taabouni began his youth career with Olympia Haarlem before joining the AZ Alkmaar youth academy in 2013. On July 1, 2022, Feyenoord announced that they had signed Taabouni to a two year deal with a third year option on a free transfer from AZ.

Personal life
Born in the Netherlands, Taabouni is of Moroccan descent.

Honours
Netherlands U17
UEFA European Under-17 Championship: 2019

References

External links
 Career stats - Voetbal International

2002 births
Living people
Footballers from Haarlem
Dutch footballers
Netherlands youth international footballers
Association football midfielders
Eerste Divisie players
Eredivisie players
Jong AZ players
AZ Alkmaar players
Feyenoord players
Dutch sportspeople of Moroccan descent